Price is an unincorporated community located in the town of Garfield, Jackson County, Wisconsin, United States.

History
A post office called Price was established in 1888, and remained in operation until it was discontinued in 1905. The community was named for William T. Price, a U.S. Representative from Wisconsin.

References

Unincorporated communities in Jackson County, Wisconsin
Unincorporated communities in Wisconsin